Sikatuna, officially the Municipality of Sikatuna,  is a 5th class municipality in the province of Bohol, Philippines. According to the 2020 census, it has a population of 6,906 people.

The town is named after Datu Sikatuna, the ancient chieftain of Bohol, although there is no evidence he lived in the area.

The town of Sikatuna,Bohol celebrates its feast on June 12–13, to honor the town patron Saint Anthony De Padua.

History

Sikatuna was formerly a part of the towns of Baclayon and Alburquerque. While part of Baclayon, Sikatuna was known as barrio Cambojod. Once Alburquerque became a town, Sikatuna was made a part of its new territory and given the name Cornago. Sikatuna became its own town in 1917. The ten barangays that now comprise Sikatuna were taken from three neighboring old municipalities: Alburquerque, Loboc, and Balilihan. In the original municipal ordinance converting barrio Cornago into a municipality, the municipal boundary was defined as barrio Cornago plus four northern barrios of Alburquerque: Libjo, Abucay Sur, Abucay Norte, and Can-agong. However, Senator Jose A. Clarin helped increase the territorial boundary by taking two barrios from Loboc: Cambuac Sur and Cambuac Norte; and two barrios from Balilihan: Badiang and Bahay-bahay. Cornago was divided into Poblacion I and Poblacion II.

World War II

During the Japanese occupation of the Philippines, Japanese forces established a garrison at the municipal building and installed a puppet mayor. During this time, Sikatuna became a haven for evacuees, both from neighboring towns and from nearby Cebu. The most famous evacuee was Don Mariano Jesus Cuenco who, after the war, became Senator and later, Secretary of Public Works. In 1945, Sikatuna was entered by Philippine Commonwealth Army soldiers and Boholano guerrillas fought against the Japanese Imperial forces during the Second Battle of Bohol.

Barangays

Sikatuna comprises 10 barangays.  Of these, only Poblacion I is classified as urban and the rest are rural.

Climate

Demographics

Economy

References

External links
 [ Philippine Standard Geographic Code]
Sikatuna
Municipality of Sikatuna
History of Sikatuna

Municipalities of Bohol